Phillip Lehman (born Philip, alternatively spelled Philippe) is a Franco-American artist, music producer, and cave diver best known as Bando, the graffiti pioneer of France who helped popularize the medium in Europe throughout the 1980s. Following this period, Lehman co-founded a string of funk labels in Paris and New York including Desco Records, the precursor to Daptone Records and his Truth & Soul Records. Since the 2000s, he has worked as a cave diver and speleologist in the Dominican Republic.

Biography 
Born in 1965 to artistic parents, Aki and Robin Lehman, Lehman was raised between New York City and Paris.

As a teenager, Lehman took part in New York graffiti culture under the name Bando, later bringing its ethos over to Europe. He is credited as bringing graffiti, particularly tagging, to France in the early 1980s and as a pioneer throughout Europe; an early and prolific participant in Europe's nascent graffiti culture, his style had particular influence into the 1990s. He was also instrumental in bringing prominent American artists like SEEN and JonOne to Europe. Among other crews, he founded Europe's first graffiti crew, Crime Time Kings, with Mode2 and Niels "Shoe" Meulman in 1985, representing the scenes of Paris, London, and Amsterdam, respectively; they reunited in 2013–2014.

He is a noted personality in the history of European graffiti and has been a subject of exhibitions like the 2010 Pinacothèque de Paris exhibit Pressionism: Masterpieces of Graffiti on Canvas, from Basquiat to Bando.  Since the 2010s, he has worked with and has been represented by Unruly Gallery in Amsterdam. He continues to produce tag art and paintings from the Dominican Republic.

An avid record collector, Lehman and a friend began compiling obscure funk 45s in the late 1980s and soon began issuing compilation LPs as Pure Records. Pure released classic and rare reissues and continued to put out compilations. They later shifted to Music Production under the Pure Productions banner. In 1995, Lehman moved back to New York City where he connected with musician Gabriel Roth, a former Pure Records customer. They soon began producing funk tracks together with other musicians. In 1997, he formed Desco Records with Roth. Located in Manhattan, Desco produced limited pressings of Lee Fields, The Sugarman 3, and the earliest Sharon Jones recordings.

In 1999–2000, Lehman and Roth decided to part ways, ending Desco after laying down the foundation to the New York afrobeat, funk and soul revival scenes. Roth would go on to co-found the seminal Daptone Records. Meanwhile, Lehman had started the gritty funk label Soul Fire Records. He put out records by Lee Fields, The Whitefield Brothers, and the like, with many backed by his house band The Mighty Imperials, a precursor to groups like El Michels Affair and Menahan Street Band.

Wanting to pursue interests outside of music, he phased out Soul Fire so to help found Truth & Soul Records with DJ Jeff Dynamite and Leon Michels, a member of The Mighty Imperials. Following the transition to the new label in 2004, he moved to the Dominican Republic.

Since the 2010s, Lehman has had a career in cave diving and exploration. He is a founding member of the Dominican Republic Speleology Society and the Madagascar Cave Diving Association, and has contributed to scientific research on aquatic life as well as underwater photography. He continues to work as an artist.

References

External links 
 The Bando Archives on Flickr
Bando on Unruly Gallery
Pure Records on Discogs
Desco Records on Discogs
Soul Fire Records on Discogs
Truth & Soul Records

Lehman family
French graffiti artists
Living people
1965 births
Pseudonymous artists
Artists from Paris
American graffiti artists
American record producers
Funk musicians
Cave diving explorers